Michoacán de Ocampo is a town in Baja California in Mexicali Municipality, around 14 miles southeast of Mexicali. The town had a population of 3,086 as of 2010. The population of Michoacán de Ocampo has grown by 21 people, about 0.69% since 2005.

References

Mexicali Municipality
Populated places in Baja California